Harry Sköld (17 June 1910 – 23 January 1988) was a Swedish rower. He competed in the men's coxed four at the 1936 Summer Olympics.

References

1910 births
1988 deaths
Swedish male rowers
Olympic rowers of Sweden
Rowers at the 1936 Summer Olympics
Sportspeople from Stockholm